The Rookie's Return is a 1920 American silent comedy film directed by Jack Nelson and written by Archer MacMackin. The film stars Douglas MacLean, Doris May, Frank Currier, Leo White, Kathleen Key, and Elinor Hancock. The film was released on December 26, 1920, by Paramount Pictures. A copy of the film is in the Library of Congress.

The film was advertised as being a sequel to 23 1/2 Hours' Leave (1919), which also starred MacLean and May, but their characters had different names in that film.

Cast
Douglas MacLean as James Stewart Lee
Doris May as Alicia
Frank Currier as Dad
Leo White as Henri
Kathleen Key as Gloria
Elinor Hancock as Mrs. Radcliffe
William Courtright	as Gregg
Frank Clark as Tubbs
Aggie Herring as Mrs. Perkins
Wallace Beery as François Dupont

References

External links 

 
The Rookie's Return at silenthollywood.com
lobby poster, color

1920 films
1920s English-language films
Silent American comedy films
1920 comedy films
Paramount Pictures films
Films directed by Jack Nelson
American black-and-white films
American silent feature films
1920s American films
English-language comedy films